Balmaceda may refer to:

The Balmaceda family, politically influential family of Chile, including:
 José Manuel Balmaceda, former president of Chile
José Rafael Balmaceda, politician and diplomat
 Balmaceda (spider), a genus of jumping spiders
 Balmaceda, Chile, a village in Chile
 Balmaceda Airport in Chile
 Balmaceda Park, urban park in Chile
 Balmaseda, a Spanish town